Christoffer Törngren (born May 16, 1994) is a Swedish professional ice hockey player. He is currently playing with HV71 of the Swedish Hockey League (SHL).

He made his Swedish Hockey League debut playing with HV71 during the 2013–14 SHL season.

Awards and honors

References

External links

1994 births
Living people
Färjestad BK players
HV71 players
Swedish ice hockey right wingers
Tingsryds AIF players